Ulidia is a genus of picture-winged flies in the family Ulidiidae.

Species
Ulidia albidipennis Loew, 1845
Ulidia apicalis Meigen, 1826
Ulidia atrata Loew, 1868
 U. atrovirens
 U. bipunctata
 U. clausa
Ulidia erythrophthalma Meigen, 1826
Ulidia facialis Hendel, 1931
 U. fascialis
 U. fulvifrons
Ulidia gongjuensis Chen, 2009
Ulidia kandybinae Zaitzev, 1982
Ulidia megacephala Loew, 1845
 U. melampodia
Ulidia metope Kameneva, 2010
 U. nigricubitalis
Ulidia nigripennis Loew, 1845
 U. nitens
 U. nitida
Ulidia omani Steyskal, 1970
Ulidia parallela Loew, 1845
 U. rubida
Ulidia ruficeps Becker, 1913
 U. salonikensis
Ulidia salonikiensis Hennig, 1940
Ulidia semiopaca Loew, 1845
 U. smaragdina
 U. splendida
Ulidia wadicola Steyskal, 1968
Ulidia xizangensis Chen, 2009

References

 
Brachycera genera
Taxa named by Johann Wilhelm Meigen